Paddington Green is a British television series, which explores the lives of a number of residents of Paddington, London. It was created by Lion Television and was first shown on the BBC in late 1998/early 1999. It is an example of the fly on the wall and docusoap television format, with narration by Ross Kemp in the first three series, followed by Todd Carty in the latter three.

Main characters 
The following people regularly appear in the programme:
 Harry
Harry has a wig-maker shop, and is also seen working on a revolutionary face cream in the basement of his shop.
 Jackie
Jackie is a transsexual woman in her late twenties, seen working the streets of Sussex Gardens as a prostitute. During the series she undertakes some surgery, and we also get a glimpse of her love of the piano (she later goes on to record her own CD). Jackie is also featured in a June 2000 one-off special called "Jackie's Story".
 Claudia
Claudia works for her father's scooter business, and is trying to embark on a singing career.
 Jason
Jason works as a locksmith, and is seemingly on call all day and night.
 Danny
Danny is a bus conductor for London Transport.
 Dave
Dave is a wheeler dealer. We see him in constant financial problems with his car park business. Later, he takes his hand at antique dealing.
 Dominique and Lia
Dominique and Lia are seeking fame and fortune at the Sylvia Young Theatre School. They are also featured in a January 1999 spin-off documentary 8.50 to Paddington Green.
 Neil
Neil works as an estate agent.
 Kelly
Kelly is a teenage model, originally from Yorkshire. She is now established as an actress known for appearing in Casualty.
 Helen
Helen is a taxi driver.

Series 
 The first series comprises 11 episodes, which originally screened from 28 December 1998 to 2 February 1999
 The second series comprises 8 episodes, which originally screened from 9 June 1999 to 28 July 1999
 The third series comprises 9 episodes, which originally screened from 15 September 1999 to 9 November 1999
 The fourth series comprises 8 episodes, which originally screened from 8 August 2000 to 31 August 2000
 The fifth series comprises 8 episodes, which originally screened from 23 January 2001 to 6 March 2001
 The sixth series comprises 8 episodes, originally screened from 5 June 2001 to 24 July 2001

References

External links 
 
 Paddington Green Lion Television (2009 archive copy)
 Paddington Green Lion Television

1990s British reality television series
2000s British reality television series
BBC Television shows
1998 British television series debuts
2001 British television series endings
Television series by All3Media